Lampaden is a municipality in the Trier-Saarburg district, in Rhineland-Palatinate, Germany. The village is over a thousand years old and acquired grazing rights in the year 1036. The area was already populated in Celtic and Roman times.

The village was heavily damaged in early March 1945 during a German counterattack.

Lampaden has 599 inhabitants (as of 2016). These include 279 men (49 %) and 288 women (51%).

References

Municipalities in Rhineland-Palatinate
Trier-Saarburg